In enzymology, a galactitol-1-phosphate 5-dehydrogenase is an enzyme that catalyzes the chemical reaction

galactitol-1-phosphate + NAD+  L-tagatose 6-phosphate + NADH + H+

Thus, the two substrates of this enzyme are galactitol-1-phosphate and NAD+, whereas its 3 products are L-tagatose 6-phosphate, NADH, and H+.

This enzyme belongs to the family of oxidoreductases, specifically those acting on the CH-OH group of donor with NAD+ or NADP+ as acceptor. The systematic name of this enzyme class is galactitol-1-phosphate:NAD+ oxidoreductase. This enzyme participates in galactose metabolism. It employs one cofactor, zinc.

References

 

EC 1.1.1
NADH-dependent enzymes
Zinc enzymes
Enzymes of unknown structure
Protein families